"Sunrise" is a song by Russian recording artist Irene Nelson. The song was written by Leona Voynalovich and produced by Vlad Tyurin.  Its released on  January 26, 2010 by Bungalo Records, as the first English single.

Track listing
CD single
 Sunrise [Jason Nevins Radio Edit] 3:37
 Sunrise [Jason Nevins Dark Radio Edit] 3:49
 Sunrise [Jason Nevins Extended Remix]	7:16
 Sunrise [Jason Nevins Dark Club Remix] 6:48
 Sunrise [Album Version] 3:50

Dance Remixes
 Sunrise [Album Version] 3:50
 Sunrise [Jason Nevins Radio Edit] 3:38
 Sunrise [Chew Fu Wasabi Radio Fix] 3:02
 Sunrise [Fonzerelli Electro House Radio Edit]	3:40
 Sunrise [Fonzerelli Piano Radio Edit]	3:32
 Sunrise [Jason Nevins Dark Radio Edit] 3:45
 Sunrise [Chew Fu Wasabi Extended Fix]	6:38
 Sunrise [Chew Fu Wasabi Dub] 6:08
 Sunrise [Fonzerelli Electro House Club Mix] 6:27
 Sunrise [Fonzerelli Electro House Dub] 6:13
 Sunrise [Fonzerelli Piano Club Mix] 6:33
 Sunrise [Jason Nevins Extended Mix] 7:14
 Sunrise [Jason Nevins Dark Club Mix] 6:42

Charts

References 

2010 singles
Electronic songs
Dance-pop songs
2010 songs